1993–94 in Argentine football saw River Plate win the Apertura championship and Independiente win the Clausura. Vélez Sársfield won their first international title, the Copa Libertadores 1994 and Gimnasia de La Plata won a special one-off Copa Centenario which was played to mark the centenary of the Argentine league system.

Torneo Apertura ("Opening" Tournament)

Top Scorer

Relegation

There is no relegation after the Apertura. For the relegation results of this tournament see below

Torneo Clausura ("Closing" Tournament)

Top Scorers

Relegation table

Relegation

Argentine clubs in international competitions

References

Argentina 1993–1994 by Pablo Ciullini  at rsssf.
Argentina 1990s by Osvaldo José Gorgazzi and Victor Hugo Kurhy at rsssf.
Copa CONMEBOL 1994 by Juan Pablo Andrés and Julio Bovi Diogo at rsssf.
Copa Libertadores 1995 by Juan Pablo Andrés and Frank Ballesteros at rsssf.

 

it:Campionato di calcio argentino 1993-1994
pl:I liga argentyńska w piłce nożnej (1993/1994)